The Queen Sirikit Museum of Textiles is located in the Grand Palace in Bangkok Thailand. The museum replaced the 1873 Ratsadakorn-bhibhathana Building (Thai: Hor Ratsadakorn Pipat) of the Royal Treasury Ministry by a request of Queen Sirikit in 2003. The building was the original organization of the current Crown Property Bureau.

History

King Chulalongkorn planned to set up a first centralize taxing system in Siam. Chulalongkorn established the Ratsadakorn-bhibhathana Building (Thai: Hor Ratsadakorn Pipat) on 4 June 1873 to operate more efficient, more discipline taxing process, later became a formation of the Customs Department. Since the custom policy was complicated, it developed the organization and management to be more effective by corporate the department to under the control of the Royal Treasury Ministry or the current Ministry of Finance by Finance Minister of Thailand.

Chulalongkorn appointed Chaturonrasmi to be an executive of the organization with he closely oversaw it. The building was designed and built by an Italian. The current Crown Property Bureau which originally had collected the monarchy asset, established in the form of an organization, since it was the private purse of the Chakri Dynasty. One of the purposes was to counter the influence of the Bunnag family who had been in control of wealth collection since early Rattanakosin.

In 1875, the Royal Treasury Ministry established at the Ratsadakorn-bhibhathana Building.

Textile museum
Queen Sirikit requested a permission to renovate a vacant building in 2003 to be a textile museum.

See also
 Calico Museum of Textiles

References

Bibliography
 

Textile museums
Museums in Thailand
1873 establishments in Siam
Museums established in 2003
Grand Palace